God He Reigns is the fourteenth album in the live praise and worship series of contemporary worship music by Hillsong Church. A single-disc version of this album was released in North America and South America by Integrity Media. The album reached No. 2 on the ARIA Albums Chart.

Recording
God He Reigns was recorded live at the Sydney Entertainment Centre on 27 February 2005 by Darlene Zschech and the Hillsong team with a congregation of 10,500. God He Reigns was released at the annual Hillsong Conference in July.

Writing and composition
The majority of songs were written by Marty Sampson, Darlene Zschech, Reuben Morgan, and Joel Houston. Raymond Badham, Ned Davies, Mia Fieldes and Miriam Webster also contributed to writing songs. Songs were written in the 12 months prior to the album recording, some songs were first recorded on the Hillsong United album Look to You.

Commercial performance
God He Reigns reached No. 2 on the Australian album charts and the DVD hit No. 1. Initially, there was doubt as to the commercial success of the album as the release coincided with the release of new albums by Guy Sebastian and Paulini, but in that week more copies of God He Reigns were sold than every other CD in Australia combined (including pop charts, alternative, rock, et cetera).

Track listing (EU/AUS)

Disc 1
 "Let Creation Sing" (Reuben Morgan) – Worship Leaders: Darlene Zschech b. Reuben Morgan
 "Salvation Is Here" (Joel Houston) – Worship Leaders: Joel Houston, b. Darlene Zschech
 "His Love" (Raymond Badham) – Worship Leader: Darlene Zschech & Paul Andrew
 "Emmanuel" (Reuben Morgan) –  Worship Leaders: Darlene Zschech b. Reuben Morgan
 "Saviour" (Darlene Zschech) – Worship Leaders: Miriam Webster b. Darlene Zschech
 "Wonderful God" (Ned Davies) – Worship Leader: Darlene Zschech, b. Joel Houston "God He Reigns"/"All I Need Is You" (chorus) (Marty Sampson) – Worship Leaders: Darlene Zschech
 "Yours Is the Kingdom" (Joel Houston) – Worship Leaders: Marty Sampson, b. Darlene Zschech
 "Welcome in This Place" (Miriam Webster) – Worship Leader: Darlene ZschechDisc 2 "Let Us Adore" (Reuben Morgan) – Worship Leaders: Darlene Zschech b. Reuben Morgan
 "All for Love" (Mia Fieldes) – Worship Leaders: Marcus Temu, Tulele Faletolu & Barry Southgate, b. Gilbert Clarke, Nathaniel Phillips & Tolu Faletolu
 "Know You More" (Darlene Zschech) – Worship Leaders: Dee Uluirewa & Darlene Zschech
 "There Is Nothing Like" (Marty Sampson & Jonas Myrin) – Worship Leaders: Marty Sampson
 "What the World Will Never Take" (Matt Crocker, Scott Ligertwood & Marty Sampson) – Worship Leaders: Marty Sampson & Tulele Faletolu
 "Tell the World" (Jonathan Douglass, Joel Houston & Marty Sampson) – Worship Leaders: Joel Houston & Jonathan Douglass, b. Darlene ZschechNotes'''
(b. = Lead Backing Vocal)
The two-disc music DVD has an extra track: "Praise in the Highest" as an 'opener', as well as documentaries.

Track listing (NA/SA)
 "Let Creation Sing" (Reuben Morgan)
 "Salvation Is Here" (Joel Houston)
 "His Love" (Raymond Badham)
 "Emmanuel" (Morgan)
 "Saviour" (Darlene Zschech)
 "Wonderful God" (Ned Davies)
 "God He Reigns"/"All I Need Is You" (chorus) (Marty Sampson)
 "Yours Is the Kingdom" (Houston)
 "Welcome in This Place" (Miriam Webster)
 "Let Us Adore" (Morgan)
 "All for Love" (Mia Fieldes)(Men of Hillsong)
 "Know You More" (Zschech)
 "There Is Nothing Like" (Sampson, Jonas Myrin)

Personnel

 Darlene Zschech – worship pastor, producer, senior worship leader, senior lead vocal, songwriter
 Joel Houston – assistant producer
 Reuben Morgan – worship leader, acoustic guitar, songwriter
 Marty Sampson – worship leader, acoustic guitar, songwriter
 Tulele Faletolu – worship leader
 Joel Houston – united worship leader, acoustic guitar, songwriter
 Jonathan Douglass (JD) – worship leader
 Miriam Webster – worship leader
 Barry Southgate – worship leader
 Marcus Temu – worship leader
 Dee Uluirewa – worship leader, vocal production
 Vera Kasevich – vocals
 Paul Nevison – vocals, acoustic guitar
 Steve McPherson – vocals, vocal production
 Julia A'Bell – vocals
 Paul Andrew – vocals
 Julie Bassett – vocals, vocal production
 Gilbert Clark – vocals
 Holly Dawson – vocals
 Deb Ezzy – vocals
 Tolu Faletolu – vocals
 Lucy Fisher – vocals
 Michelle Grigg – vocals
 Peter Hart – vocals
 Scott Haslem – vocals, vocal production
 Karen Horn – vocals
 Nathan Phillips – vocals
 Aran Puddle – vocals
 Katrina Tadman – vocals
 Beci Wakerley – vocals
 Matthew Hope – trumpet, brass director, flugelhorn
 Ian Fisher – bass
 Nigel Hendroff – acoustic guitar, electric guitar
 Jonno Louwrens – saxophone
 Raymond Badham – acoustic guitar, music direction
 Sonja Bailey – Percussion
 Marcüs Beaumont – electric guitar
 Jason Blackboum – drum technician
 Tim Whincop – trumpet
 Michael Guy Chislett – electric guitar
 Craig Gower – piano, keyboards
 Elisha Vella – percussion
 Gary Honor – saxophone
 Stephanie Lambert – trumpet
 Rick Petereit – drum technician
 Steve Luke – trombone
 Greg Hughes – trombone
 Peter King – piano, keyboards
 Joel Houston – bass
 Peter Kelly – percussion
 Peter James – keyboards
 David Holmes – acoustic guitar, electric guitar
 Mike Short – bass technician
 Marty Beaton – keyboard technician, piano technician, guitar technician
 Rolf Wam Fjell – drums
 Timothy Dearmin – saxophone
 Matt Tennikoff – bass
 Sam O'Donnell – drum technician
 Justin Hopkins – drum technician
 Kevin Lee – piano, keyboards
 David Holmes – acoustic guitar, electric guitar
 Peter Wilson – electric guitar
 Marty Beaton – guitar technician
 Jad Gillies – electric guitar
 Timothy Dearmin – saxophone
 Rebecca Gunn – cello
 Dan Munns – guitar technician
 Tirza VanBreda – cello
 Matt Tennikoff – bass
 George Whippy – bass
 Gio Galanti – keyboards
 Sonja Crocker – percussion
 Hillsong Church Choir
 Brian Houston – senior pastor
 Bobbie Houston – senior pastor

References 

2005 live albums
2005 video albums
Live video albums
Hillsong Music live albums
Hillsong Music video albums

pt:God He Reigns